The Rerun Show is an American sketch comedy television series that aired on NBC from August 1, 2002 until August 20, 2002. VH1 also aired the show on Fridays at 11:30 P.M. The series was created by John Davies and David Salzman.

Synopsis
The show spoofed many popular classics including The Jeffersons, The Facts of Life, Married... with Children, What's Happening!!, Saved by the Bell, Diff'rent Strokes, Bewitched, The Partridge Family, and One Day at a Time. Each episode consisted of two sitcom parodies poking fun at the actors who originally played the roles while twisting the original episodes' subtext. On some episodes, the original actors would make appearances (i.e. Gary Coleman in a Diff'rent Strokes parody).

The series started with strong ratings, debuting in the Top 10. However, ratings soon dropped off and NBC canceled the series after seven episodes. Cast members Paul Vogt and Daniele Gaither would later join the cast of MADtv, with Vogt joining the cast in season 8 shortly after Rerun's cancellation and Gaither joining the cast the following season.

Cast
 Paul Vogt
 Brian Beacock
 Ashley Eckstein
 Candy Ford
 Daniele Gaither
 Danielle Hoover
 Donald Gene Reed
 Mitch Silpa

Guest stars
 Aries Spears
 Marla Gibbs
 Gary Coleman
 David Faustino
 Erik Estrada
 Dennis Haskins
 Todd Bridges
 Dustin Diamond
 Fred 'Rerun' Berry
 Alfonso Ribeiro
 Danny Bonaduce 
 Alex Michel

Episodes

Ratings
Episode 1 (2002-08-01) - 9.4 million viewers
Episode 2 (2002-08-06) - 5.8 million 
Episode 3 (2002-08-08) - 6.6 million
Episode 4 (2002-08-13) - 5.0 million
Episode 5 (2002-08-15) - 5.9 million
Episode 6 (2002-08-20) - 4.7 million
Episode 7 (2002-08-20) - 4.5 million

References

External links
  
 

2002 American television series debuts
2002 American television series endings
2000s American parody television series
2000s American sketch comedy television series
NBC original programming
Television series about television
Television series by Sony Pictures Television
Television series by Universal Television